The 86th Academy Awards ceremony, presented by the Academy of Motion Picture Arts and Sciences (AMPAS), honored the best films of 2013 and took place on March 2, 2014, at the Dolby Theatre in Hollywood, Los Angeles beginning at 5:30 p.m. PST / 8:30 p.m. EST. The ceremony was scheduled well after its usual late-February date to avoid conflicting with the 2014 Winter Olympics. During the ceremony, the Academy of Motion Picture Arts and Sciences presented Academy Awards (commonly referred to as Oscars) in 24 categories. The ceremony was televised in the United States by ABC, and produced by Neil Meron and Craig Zadan and directed by Hamish Hamilton. Actress Ellen DeGeneres hosted the show for the second time, having previously hosted the 79th ceremony held in 2007.

In related events, the academy held its 5th annual Governors Awards ceremony at the Grand Ballroom of the Hollywood and Highland Center on November 16, 2013. On February 15, 2014, in a ceremony at The Beverly Hills Hotel in Beverly Hills, California, the Academy Awards for Technical Achievement were presented by hosts Kristen Bell and Michael B. Jordan.

12 Years a Slave won three awards, including Best Picture. Other winners included Gravity with seven awards, Dallas Buyers Club with three, Frozen and The Great Gatsby with two, and Blue Jasmine, The Great Beauty, Helium, Her, The Lady in Number 6: Music Saved My Life, Mr Hublot, and 20 Feet from Stardom with one. The telecast garnered nearly 44 million viewers in the United States, making it the most watched Oscar ceremony since the 72nd Academy Awards in 2000.

Winners and nominees

The nominees for the 86th Academy Awards were announced on January 16, 2014, at 5:38 a.m. PST (13:38 UTC), at the Samuel Goldwyn Theater in Beverly Hills, California, by Cheryl Boone Isaacs, president of the academy, and actor Chris Hemsworth. American Hustle and Gravity tied for the most nominations with ten each.

The winners were announced during the awards ceremony on March 2, 2014. American Hustle became David O. Russell's second consecutive film to earn nominations in all acting categories and the fifteenth film overall in Oscar history to achieve this distinction, but the first such film to not win any since 1936's My Man Godfrey. It also was the third film after Gangs of New York and True Grit to lose all ten of its nominations. Steve McQueen became the first black director to direct a Best Picture winner and the third such person to receive a nomination for directing. Alfonso Cuarón became the first person of Mexican descent to win Best Director. With Matthew McConaughey and Jared Leto's respective wins in the Best Actor and Best Supporting Actor categories, Dallas Buyers Club was the fifth film to win both male acting awards. Additionally, 3 other films (American Hustle, 12 Years a Slave, and The Wolf of Wall Street) also received nominations for both Best Actor and Best Supporting Actor. Cate Blanchett became the sixth actress to have won both female acting awards in her career. Lupita Nyong'o was the sixteenth Oscar acting winner to win for a debut film performance and the ninth Best Supporting Actress recipient to achieve this feat. Best Original Song co-winner Robert Lopez became the youngest individual to win an Academy, Emmy, Grammy, and Tony Award and the twelfth person overall to earn these accolades.

Awards

Winners are listed first, highlighted in boldface, and indicated with a double dagger.

Honorary Academy Awards
The academy held its 5th Annual Governors Awards ceremony on November 16, 2013, during which the following awards were presented.

Academy Honorary Awards
 Angela Lansbury  An entertainment icon who has created some of cinema's most memorable characters, inspiring generations of actors.
 Steve Martin  In recognition of his extraordinary talents and the unique inspiration he has brought to the art of motion pictures.
 Piero Tosi  A visionary whose incomparable costume designs shaped timeless, living art in motion pictures.

Jean Hersholt Humanitarian Award
 Angelina Jolie

Films with multiple nominations and awards

The following 19 films received multiple nominations:

The following five films received multiple awards:

Presenters and performers
The following individuals and groups, listed in order of appearance, presented awards or performed musical numbers.

Presenters

Performers

Ceremony information 

Despite the mixed reception received from the preceding year's ceremony, the academy rehired Neil Meron and Craig Zadan as producers for the second consecutive year. However, actor Seth MacFarlane announced that he would not host the Oscars for a second time. In a statement released through Twitter, he wrote "Traumatized critics exhale: I'm unable to do the Oscars again. Tried to make it work schedule-wise, but I need sleep." Furthermore, actress and comedian Tina Fey, who co-hosted the 70th Golden Globe Awards more than a month earlier with fellow Saturday Night Live alumnus Amy Poehler, told Huffington Post columnist Mike Ryan that she would reject any offer to host an Oscar telecast commenting, "I just feel like that gig is so hard. Especially for, like, a woman – the amount of months that would be spent trying on dresses alone – no way."

Shortly after the election of AMPAS president Cheryl Boone Isaacs in August 2013, Meron and Zadan announced that comedian and talk show host Ellen DeGeneres would host the 2014 ceremony. They explained their decision to bring back DeGeneres as host saying, "As a longtime friend, we had always hoped to find a project for us to do together and nothing could be more exciting than teaming up to do the Oscars. There are few stars today who have Ellen's gift for comedy, with her great warmth and humanity. She is beloved everywhere and we expect that the audience at the Dolby Theatre and in homes around the globe will be as excited by this news as we are." DeGeneres expressed that she was thrilled to be selected to emcee the gala again, commenting, "I am so excited to be hosting the Oscars for the second time. You know what they say – the third time's the charm."

As with last year's theme of music and the movies, Meron and Zadan centered the show around a theme. This year, they christened the show with a theme of saluting movie heroes commenting, "By celebrating the gamut of heroes who have enriched our movie-going experience, we hope to create an evening of fun and joy. And that includes the filmmakers and actors who take risks and stimulate us with provocative subjects and daring characters. They are all heroes in the cinematic landscape." To coincide with the theme, AMPAS presented an exhibition in the lobby of its Beverly Hills headquarters titled "The Oscars Celebrate Movie Heroes". The exhibit featured posters, photographs, and artifacts from 70 different films featuring literary, comic book, and real life heroes. Furthermore, actor Andrew Garfield, who portrayed the titular character in The Amazing Spider-Man, was scheduled to appear onstage with five-year-old cancer survivor Miles Scott with Garfield christening Scott as an "official superhero". The segment was scrapped, however, due to time constraints.

Several other people were involved with the telecast and its promotion. Tony Award-winning art director Derek McLane designed a new set and stage design for the show. Filmmaker Paul Feig produced and directed a one-minute trailer promoting the event featuring DeGeneres and 250 dancers dancing and lip-synching to the song "The Walker" by rock band Fitz and the Tantrums. During the ceremony, actor Channing Tatum introduced a group called "Team Oscar". The team consisted of six young film students from colleges across the country selected by AMPAS whose role was to deliver Oscar statuettes to the presenters during the gala. Television personality and former Miss USA titleholder Rachel Smith hosted "Inside the Oscars", a behind-the-scenes video blog on the Oscar ceremony website.

Box office performance of nominated films
At the time of the nominations announcement on January 16, 2014, the combined gross of the nine Best Picture nominees at the American and Canadian box offices was $645 million, with an average of $72 million per film. When the nominations were revealed, Gravity was the highest-grossing film among the Best Picture nominees with $256 million in domestic box office receipts. Captain Phillips was the second-highest-grossing film with $105.5 million; this was followed by American Hustle ($105.4 million), The Wolf of Wall Street ($80.7 million), 12 Years a Slave ($39 million), Philomena ($22.3 million), Dallas Buyers Club ($16.8 million), Her ($9.9 million), and finally Nebraska ($8.5 million).

Of the top 50 grossing movies of the year, 47 nominations went to 14 films on the list. Only Frozen (1st), Despicable Me 2 (3rd), Gravity (7th), The Croods (14th), Captain Phillips (29th), American Hustle (30th), and The Wolf of Wall Street (42nd) were nominated for Best Picture, Best Animated Feature or any of the directing, acting or screenwriting awards. The other top 50 box office hits that earned nominations were Iron Man 3 (2nd), The Hobbit: The Desolation of Smaug (8th), Star Trek Into Darkness (11th), The Great Gatsby (17th), Jackass Presents: Bad Grandpa (31st), The Lone Ranger (38th), and Saving Mr. Banks (48th).

DeGeneres' Oscar selfie
Prior to the introduction of the Academy Awards for Technical Achievement montage, DeGeneres and several ceremony attendees such as Bradley Cooper, Jared Leto, Jennifer Lawrence, Julia Roberts, Kevin Spacey, Meryl Streep, Angelina Jolie, Brad Pitt, Channing Tatum, Lupita Nyong'o, and Peter Nyong'o (Lupita's brother) participated in a group selfie. The resulting tweet initially disabled the site and was eventually retweeted on Twitter over 3.4 million times. It surpassed the previous record retweet of Barack and Michelle Obama's post-election hug photo, which had been retweeted 778,000 times, in just 35 minutes. The selfie was taken with a Samsung Galaxy Note 3, provided by the company as part of a $20 million marketing campaign.

"Adele Dazeem" incident
While introducing the performance of "Let It Go" from Frozen, actor John Travolta accidentally mispronounced singer Idina Menzel's name as "Adele Dazeem". As a result, Travolta became the subject of mockery and ridicule in the media. According to a source for E!, Menzel revealed that she was not upset about the mishap. Afterwards, Menzel reportedly printed up satirical playbills that promoted her name as Adele Dazeem, noting her past work in Nert (Rent), Wicked-ly (Wicked) and Farfignugen (Frozen). Three days after the ceremony, Travolta publicly apologized to Menzel for mispronouncing her name. The following year, Menzel and Travolta appeared onstage together as award presenters, with the former introducing the latter as "Glom Gozingo".

Critical reviews
The show received a mixed reception from media publications. Some media outlets were more critical of the show. Pittsburgh Post-Gazette television critic Rob Owen wrote, "Ms. DeGeneres brought predictable respectability to Sunday's 86th Academy Awards. Too bad this particular brand of predictable respectability was a bore." He also criticized the clip packages saluting movie heroes as "big a waste of time as Oscar montages almost always are." Columnist Alan Sepinwall of HitFix commented, "It was a long, disjointed ceremony, and what was fun and likely to endure came entirely from the winners and their speeches." He went on to say that many of DeGeneres's stunts fell flat and that The Wizard of Oz 75th anniversary tribute "felt much too random." Tim Goodman of The Hollywood Reporter said, "It was a turgid affair, badly directed, poorly produced and featuring an endless string of either tired or wince-inducing moments by DeGeneres, who, by the last 30 or so minutes, seemed to have given up entirely." In addition, he noted that the show was overstuffed with montages and stunts that dragged down the pacing of the telecast.

Other media outlets received the broadcast more positively. Television critic Matt Roush of TV Guide commented that DeGeneres "made the Oscars' inevitable dull patches felt less painful than usual." He also praised the cast and several musical numbers from the show. Frazier Moore of the Associated Press lauded DeGeneres's performance writing that, "She seemed to be committed to an unspoken theme for the evening: Humanize Hollywood's glitterati for the viewers. In return, the stars were on their best behavior." He concluded, "All in all, a sleek show was the Oscarcast. Few bombshells, fewer embarrassments, from fade-in to fade-out." Entertainment editor Marlow Stern of The Daily Beast raved, "DeGeneres followed in the footsteps of the most successful awards show hosts—Billy Crystal, the duo of Fey & Poehler, etc.—who have taken advantage of the audience, engaging in gleeful interactions with the plethora of A-listers there (when they're not mocking them)."

Ratings and reception
The American telecast on ABC drew in an average of 43.74 million people over its length, which was a 6% increase from the previous year's ceremony. An estimated 72 million total viewers watched all or part of the awards. The show also earned higher Nielsen ratings compared to the previous telecast with 24.7% of households watching over a 38 share. In addition, the program scored a higher 18-49 demo rating with a 13.3 rating over a 33 share among viewers in that demographic. It is the second highest-rated Oscars telecast on 21st-century U.S. television, trailing only behind the 72nd ceremony held in 2000.

In July 2014, the ceremony presentation received eight nominations for the 66th Primetime Emmys. The following month, the ceremony won one of those nominations for Outstanding Art Direction for a Variety, Nonfiction, Reality, or Reality-Competition Program (Derek McLane, Joe Celli, and Gloria Lamb).

In Memoriam
The annual In Memoriam tribute was presented by actress Glenn Close. The montage featured an excerpt of the main title from Somewhere in Time by composer John Barry. At the conclusion of the tribute, singer Bette Midler performed her song "Wind Beneath My Wings" from the film Beaches. Before "In Memoriam" and while co-presenting Best Cinematography, Bill Murray paid an additional tribute to Harold Ramis. After co-presenter Amy Adams presented the nominees, Murray says "Oh, we forgot one. Harold Ramis for Caddyshack, Ghostbusters and Groundhog Day."

James Gandolfini - Actor 
Karen Black - Actress 
Tom Laughlin - Actor, director, writer 
Ruth Prawer Jhabvala - Writer 
Carmen Zapata - Actress
Hal Needham - Director, stunt coordinator 
Richard Shepherd - Producer, executive 
Stuart Freeborn - Makeup artist 
Gerry Hambling - Film editor 
Jim Kelly - Actor, martial artist
Stephenie McMillan - Set decorator 
Les Blank - Documentarian 
Eileen Brennan - Actress 
Paul Walker - Actor 
Fay Kanin - Writer, academy president 
Charles L. Campbell - Sound editor
Deanna Durbin - Actress 
Frédéric Back - Animator 
A. C. Lyles - Producer
Elmore Leonard - Writer 
Annette Funicello - Actress 
Petro Vlahos - Visual effects, inventor 
Eduardo Coutinho - Documentarian 
Saul Zaentz - Producer
Riz Ortolani - Composer 
Peter O'Toole - Actor 
Ray Harryhausen - Visual effects 
Brian Ackland-Snow - Production designer 
Richard Griffiths - Actor 
Sid Caesar - Actor 
Roger Ebert - Critic
Shirley Temple Black - Actress 
Joan Fontaine - Actress 
Run Run Shaw - Producer, executive
Juanita Moore - Actress 
Mickey Moore - 2nd unit director
Stefan Kudelski - Inventor
Harold Ramis - Director, writer, actor 
Eleanor Parker - Actress 
Ray Dolby - Inventor, engineer
Julie Harris - Actress 
Maximilian Schell - Actor 
Richard Matheson - Writer 
Gilbert Taylor - Cinematographer 
Tom Sherak - Executive, academy president
Esther Williams - Actress 
Philip Seymour Hoffman - Actor

Shortly after Midler finished singing, camera assistant Sarah Jones, who died more than a week prior to the ceremony, was briefly mentioned before the commercial break.

See also
 20th Screen Actors Guild Awards
 34th Golden Raspberry Awards
 56th Grammy Awards
 66th Primetime Emmy Awards
 67th British Academy Film Awards
 68th Tony Awards
 71st Golden Globe Awards
 List of submissions to the 86th Academy Awards for Best Foreign Language Film

Notes 
a:The Academy revoked the Best Original Song nomination for Alone yet Not Alones title song after determining that composer Bruce Broughton violated the Academy's promotional regulations. Broughton, a former Academy governor and member of the music branch's executive committee, had emailed other music branch members to inform them of his submission.
b:"John Mac McMurphy" is a pseudonym for Jean-Marc Vallée.

References

External links 

Official websites
 
 

News resources

 Oscars 2014 BBC News
 Oscars 2014 Empire
 Oscars 2014 The Guardian

Analysis

 2013 Academy Awards Winners and History Filmsite
 Academy Awards, USA: 2014 Internet Movie Database

Other resources

 

2013 film awards
2014 in Los Angeles
Academy Awards ceremonies
Ellen DeGeneres
2014 in American cinema
2014 awards in the United States
March 2014 events in the United States
Television shows directed by Hamish Hamilton (director)